Panienka z okienka is a 1964 Polish romance film directed by Maria Kaniewska.

Cast
 Pola Raksa as Hedwiga / Marysia Kalinowska
 Jadwiga Chojnacka as Mina - maid
 Aleksandra Karzyńska as Mrs. Flora
 Halina Kossobudzka as Salomea Korycka
 Wiesława Kwaśniewska as Fruzia - Flora's maid
 Małgorzata Szancer as Krysia
 Krzysztof Chamiec as Cornelius
 Mariusz Dmochowski as Duke Jerzy Ossolinski
 Kazimierz Fabisiak as Johannes Szulc
 Janusz Gajos as Pietrek

References

External links
 

1964 films
1960s romance films
Polish romance films
1960s Polish-language films